Oak Street School is a historic school building located at Fulton in Oswego County, New York.  It is a rectangular red brick structure, trimmed in cast stone and built in 1913–1914.  It is a two-story building over a high brick basement. It ceased being used as a school in 1991. It has since been retrofitted into small apartments used primarily by senior residents of the city.

It was listed on the National Register of Historic Places in 2003.

References

External links
Oak Street School, Fulton, NY, USA - Former Schools on Waymarking.com (Website Contains Incorrect Information)

School buildings on the National Register of Historic Places in New York (state)
School buildings completed in 1913
Buildings and structures in Oswego County, New York
1913 establishments in New York (state)
National Register of Historic Places in Oswego County, New York